Trechona is a genus of South American curtain web spiders that was first described by C. L. Koch in 1850. The venom of at least one species is considered potentially dangerous to humans.

Characteristics 
Spiders of this genus grow up to 5 cm in length, are brownish to blackened, with a '' zebra '' coloring on the abdomen, with clear transverse bands, the lyre is composed of rigid bristles of different sizes. They are spiders of fossorial and nocturnal habits, found in tunnels dug in ravines, also on top of logs or rocks in the forest, this species is very common in the Atlantic forest. Studies show that the venom of T. venosa is more potent than that of the Brazilian yellow scorpion (Tityus serrulatus). Few recorded accidents, possibly caused by T. rufa.

The venom of T. venosa has a lethal dose of 0.070 mg for 20 grams rat by subcutaneous injection, and 0.030 mg by intravenous injection, 2 mg by intramuscular injection results in muscle contractions, paralysis and death in rats, while 0.4 mg results in death by tetanism, for pigeons, the lethal dose ranges from 0.01-0.007 mg, by intravenous injection. The average yield is 1,00 mg, and the maximum is 1,70 mg.

Species
 it contains 7 species, all found in Brazil:
Trechona adspersa Bertkau, 1880 – Brazil
Trechona cotia Pedroso, de Miranda & Baptista, 2019 — Brazil
Trechona diamantina Guadanuccia, Fonseca-Ferreira, Baptista & Pedroso, 2016 – Brazil
Trechona excursora Pedroso, de Miranda & Baptista, 2019 — Brazil
Trechona rufa Vellard, 1924 – Brazil
Trechona uniformis Mello-Leitão, 1935 – Brazil
Trechona venosa (Latreille, 1832) (type) – Brazil

References

Dipluridae
Mygalomorphae genera
Spiders of Brazil